Mariya Alekseyevna Bulakhova (born November 18, 1988) is a Russian former swimmer, who specialized in butterfly events. She collected two medals, gold and silver, in the 100 (59.98) and 200 m butterfly (2:10.60) at the 2004 European Junior Swimming Championships in Lisbon, Portugal. Bulakhova is a member of Volga Swimming Club, and is coached and trained by Natalia Kozlova.

Bulakhova qualified for the women's 200 m butterfly, as Russia's youngest swimmer (aged 15), at the 2004 Summer Olympics in Athens, by eclipsing a FINA B-standard entry time of 2:14.07 from the European Junior Championships. She edged out Chinese Taipei's Cheng Wan-jung to lead the first heat by a 3.26-second margin in 2:12.99. Bulakhova missed the semifinals by two thirds of a second (0.66), as she placed eighteenth overall in the prelims.

References

External links
Profile – Russian Swimming Team 

1988 births
Living people
Russian female swimmers
Olympic swimmers of Russia
Swimmers at the 2004 Summer Olympics
Female butterfly swimmers
Sportspeople from Volgograd